The Cherry 16 is a  light weight trailer sailer designed by Frank Pelin in the 1970s. The hull is assembled from plywood using the stitch and glue method and can be assembled by an amateur boat builder. Plans for the construction of the Cherry 16 are still commercially available from Pelin Plans (New Zealand).

References

External links 
 Pelin Plans

Trailer sailers